Moulsham High School is mixed gender Academy for 11 - 18 year olds in Chelmsford, Essex.

About Moulsham High School

Moulsham is a mixed gender Academy for 11 - 18 year olds, located in Chelmsford, Essex.  

The Headteacher is Julia Mead. There were 76 teaching staff in 2019. 

There were 1578 pupils enrolled in 2021/2022.

Most Recent Ofsted Report

Highlights from the latest (Jan 2020) Ofsted report   include:
 "Personal development and well-being of students is outstanding"
 "All groups of learners are well cared for and supported"
 "Students put their good knowledge to excellent effect"

History 

The Moulsham High School was built in 1938 as two separate schools one for senior boys, and one for senior girls. The head teacher for the boys from 1938 to 1950 was Jock Hutchinson  (see Talk), 1950-1972 Mr. Smith, 1972-1991 Hedley B. Andrews (see Talk), 1991-2010 Dr. Nicholls, 2010-2019 Mr. Farmer. The girls school, head teacher was  1938-1942 Ms. Sayers (Brown), Ms. Portzi, Ms. Golledge. Head teacher for mixed gender school 2019-present, Julia Mead.

Notable former pupils

 Alex Hassell, actor, The Miniaturist (2017), Cowboy Bebop (2021), and His Dark Materials (2022).
 Cameron James professional footballer, Chelmsford City, Colchester United and Braintree Town
 Lindsay Keable netball player, Saracens Mavericks, London Pulse, England netball team

References

External links
Moulsham High School

Academies in Essex
Secondary schools in Essex
Schools in Chelmsford